William Inge may refer to:

 William Motter Inge (1913–1973), American playwright and novelist.
 William Inge (judge) (c. 1260–1322), English attorney
 William Marshall Inge (1802–1846), American legislator and attorney
 William M. Inge (Mississippi politician) (1832-1900), American politician
 William Inge (American football) (born 1973), American football coach
 William Ralph Inge (1860–1954), English author, priest, and theologian
 Will Inge (William Walter Inge, 1907–1991), English cricketer
 William Inge (cricketer, born 1829) (1829–1903), English cricketer and clergyman
 William Inge (Member of Parliament) (1669–1731), English Tory politician, scholar, and antiquary who represented Tamworth

See also 
 Inge, a given name